Fern Ridge Reservoir (or Fern Ridge Lake) is a reservoir on the Long Tom River in the U.S. state of Oregon.

Surrounding portions of the reservoir is the Fern Ridge Wildlife Area, a wildlife management area providing a unique habitat for a variety of species including wintering waterfowl populations.

Fern Ridge Dam 

The Fern Ridge Dam was completed in 1942, and is currently one of 13 multi-purpose dams operated by the Corps of Engineers in the Willamette Valley.  The dam provides flood control, irrigation, recreation, navigation, and improved downstream water quality. The water level is kept high from May through September for recreation purposes.

The U.S. Army Corps of Engineers’ major repair effort of Fern Ridge Dam on the Long Tom River near Eugene began in June 2005 and was completed in late October 2005. The internal drainage system was repaired and the embankment dam was rebuilt.

Recreation

Fern Ridge is home to multiple parks and yacht clubs, both private and county-managed.
During the summer, strong, generally northerly winds develop in the afternoon and usually last until dusk. Because these winds are quite reliable, Fern Ridge has become a popular sailing destination for the nearby population. The Eugene Yacht Club hosts several annual regattas as well as class championships.

See also
 List of lakes in Oregon

References

External links 

 U.S. Army Corps of Engineers page on Fern Ridge Reservoir dam renovation
 Oregon Department of Fish and Wildlife guide to Fern Ridge Wildlife Area
 Oregon's Important Bird Areas - Fern Ridge Reservoir

Reservoirs in Oregon
Lakes of Lane County, Oregon
Buildings and structures in Lane County, Oregon
Protected areas of Lane County, Oregon
1942 establishments in Oregon